Arizona Proposition 102 was an amendment to the constitution of the state of Arizona adopted by a ballot measure held in 2008. It added Article 30 of the Arizona Constitution, which says: "Only a union of one man and one woman shall be valid or recognized as a marriage in this state." The amendment added a constitutional ban on same-sex marriage to existing statutory bans in place since 1996. In October 2014, Article 30 of the Arizona Constitution was struck down as unconstitutional in the United States District Court for the District of Arizona, and is no longer enforced by the state of Arizona, which now allows and recognizes same-sex marriages.

Despite the court ruling, Article 30 still remains on the state's constitution, and on the Arizona State Legislature's website, there are no notes within the page for Article 30 that that part of the constitution was struck down or otherwise rendered inoperative.

Overview 

On August 26, 2008, Arizona Attorney General Terry Goddard and Secretary of State Jan Brewer agreed that the ballot description would state that same-sex marriage was already prohibited by statute. Incorporating the same provision into the Arizona Constitution was meant to prevent an Arizona court from ruling that the statute was invalid under the Arizona Constitution.

Along with similar measures in California (California Proposition 8 (2008)) and Florida (Florida Amendment 2 (2008)), Proposition 102 was decided by voters in the general election on November 4, 2008. The amendment passed by a margin of 56% in favor and 44% against.

Proposition 102 had no immediate impact because its definition of marriage was consistent with the existing statutory definition. As an amendment to the Constitution of Arizona, the definition cannot be changed by the state legislature, and the possibility that a state court might find a state constitutional guarantee of same-sex couples' right to marry is eliminated.

Supporters and opponents 
As of August 27, 2008 three committees related to Proposition 102 were registered with the Secretary of State: YESforMarriage.com supporting Prop 102 was the one committee in support, and the two committees in opposition were No on Prop 102 and Arizona Together Opposed to Prop 102.

Supporters said that Proposition 102 was necessary to prevent judges changing the legal definition of marriage, as was done in Massachusetts, California, Connecticut and Iowa. Opponents said that Proposition 102 was unnecessary because same-sex marriage was already illegal in Arizona, and that there were more pressing issues facing Arizona; also they cited the issue of the separation of church and state.

Miscellaneous 
Proposition 102 was placed on the ballot via referendum rather than through the initiative process on the last day of the legislative session.  Presiding State Senator Jack Harper defeated a filibuster on June 27, 2008 to place the proposed Constitutional Amendment on the ballot. Harper faced an ethics investigation over allegedly violating Senate rules by cutting off the microphones of two senators who were attempting to filibuster the bill. Despite the fact that Harper admitted to cutting off the microphones intentionally, a Senate ethics committee consisting of three Republicans and two Democrats voted 3–2, along strict party lines, to dismiss the charges.

State Senators Jack W. Harper, Ronald Gould, Thayer Verschoor, and John Huppenthal stood out as the proponents of the Marriage Amendment to the Arizona State Constitution. The language of Prop 102 was adopted as a strike-everything amendment to Senator Gould's SCR1042.

In 2006, a more restrictive measure, Proposition 107, had been defeated in the general election.

Results

By county

Full text

See also 
 Arizona Proposition 107 (2006)
 List of Arizona Ballot Propositions
 LGBT rights in Arizona

References

External links 
 YESforMarriage.com (Yes on Prop 102)
 Arizona Together (No on Prop 102)
 Arizona Proposition 102 (2008) – Ballotpedia
 The Money Behind the 2008 Same-Sex Partnership Ballot Measures – The National Institute On Money In State Politics

2008 Arizona elections
2008 ballot measures
Arizona ballot measures
LGBT in Arizona
U.S. state constitutional amendments banning same-sex unions
2008 in LGBT history
Same-sex marriage ballot measures in the United States